Hélio Sanches (born 10 May 1991) is a Cape Verdean volleyball player who plays for Sporting CP.

Honours
 Portuguese Volleyball Super Cup: 2017

References

1991 births
Living people
Cape Verdean sportspeople
Sporting CP volleyball players